Meiron (Mayrûn) was a Palestinian village, located  west of Safad. Associated with the ancient Canaanite city of Merom, excavations at the site have found extensive remains from the Hellenistic and Early Roman periods. The remains include a 3rd-century synagogue, and Meiron served as a prominent local religious centre at the time.

From the 13th century onward, Meiron was a popular site for Jewish pilgrims. During Ottoman rule in Palestine, the Jewish population fluctuated considerably, with at least two-thirds of the population being Arab Muslims. Landownership in the village was nonetheless split almost evenly between Arabs and Jews. Depopulated in two waves over the course of the 1948 Arab-Israeli war, the moshav of Meron was founded in its place in 1949 by Israeli soldiers who fought in that war.

History

Bronze and Iron Ages
The association of Meiron with the ancient Canaanite city of Merom or Maroma is generally accepted, though the absence of hard archaeological evidence means other sites a little further north, thus today located in southern Lebanon, such as Marun ar-Ras or Jebel Marun, have also been considered. Merom is mentioned in 2nd millennium BCE Egyptian sources, and in Tiglath-pileser III's accounts of his expedition to the Galilee in 733-732 BCE (where it is transcribed as Marum).

Soundings conducted below the floors of houses excavated in the 1970s indicate the presence of even earlier structures with a different layout. While these lower levels have not yet been excavated, the possibility that they date back to the Early Bronze Age was not ruled out by the archaeologists. A handful of artifacts dating to the Early Bronze Age, including seal impressions and a basalt bowl, were also found during the digs.

Classical Antiquity
Excavations at Meiron found artifacts dating to the Hellenistic period at the foundation of the site. The economic and cultural affinities of the inhabitants of the Meiron area at this time were directed toward the north, to Tyre and southern Syria in general. Josephus fortified Meiron in the 1st century CE and called the town Mero or Meroth; however, Negev writes that Meroth, another ancient town, was located further north, possibly at the site of Marun as-Ras.

According to Avraham Negev, an Israeli archaeologist, by the Second Temple period, Merom was known as Meiron. It is mentioned in the Talmud as being a village in which sheep were reared, that was also renowned for its olive oil. The Reverend R. Rappaport ventured that merino, the celebrated wool, may have its etymological roots in the name for the village.

In the last decade of the 3rd century CE, a synagogue was erected in the village. Known as the Meiron synagogue, it survived an earthquake in 306 CE, though excavations at the site indicate that it was severely damaged or destroyed by another earthquake in 409 CE. "One of the largest Palestinian synagogues in the basilica style," it is the earliest example of the so-called 'Galilean' synagogue, and consists of a large room with eight columns on each side leading to the facade and a three-doored entrance framed by a columned portico. Artifacts uncovered during digs at the site include a coin of Emperor Probus (276-282 CE) and African ceramics dating to the latter half of the 3rd century, indicating that the city was commercially prosperous at the time. Coins found in Meiron are mostly from Tyre, though a large number are also from Hippos, which lay on the other side of Lake Tiberias. Peregrine Horden and Nicholas Purcell write that Meiron was a prominent local religious centre in the period of late Antiquity. Some time in the 4th century CE, Meiron was abandoned for reasons as yet unknown.

Early Islamic to Mamluk periods
Denys Pringle describes Meiron as a "[f]ormer Jewish village," with a synagogue and tombs dating to the 3rd and 4th centuries, noting the site was later reoccupied between 750 and 1399.

In the 12th century, Benjamin de Tudela, a Navarrese rabbi, visited Meiron and described a cave of tombs located there believed to hold the remains of Hillel, Shammai, and "twenty of their disciples and other Rabbis." On his visit to Meiron in 1210, Samuel ben Samson, a French rabbi, located the tombs of Simeon bar Yochai and his son Eleazar b. Simeon there. A contemporary of the second Jewish revolt against Rome (132-135 CE), bar Yochai is venerated by Moroccan Jews, whose veneration of saints is thought to be an adaptation of local Muslim customs. From the 13th century onward, Meiron became the most frequented site of pilgrimage for Jews in Palestine.

In the early 14th century, Arab geographer al-Dimashqi mentioned Meiron as falling under the administration of Safad. He reported that it was located near a "well-known cave" where Jews and possibly non-Jewish locals travelled to celebrate a festival, which involved witnessing the sudden and miraculous rise of water from basins and sarcophagi in the cave.

Ottoman period
Palestine was incorporated into the Ottoman Empire in 1517, and in 1555 the villagers paid a tax on silk spinning. By the 1596 tax register, Meiron was located in the nahiya ("subdistrict") of Jira, part of Sanjak Safad. It was registered as a large village, with 115 households and 15 bachelors, an estimated 715 persons, all Muslims. The village paid taxes on goats, beehives, and a press that processed either grapes or olives; a total of 13,810 akçe.   In 1609, Rabbi Shlumil of Safad wrote that there were many synagogues in ruins and empty of people.

Turkish traveller Evliya Çelebi, who visited about 1648, told that as the Jewish festival approached, thousands of people, "mostly Druzes, Timānis, Yezīdies and Mervāvis", gathered inside a cave at Meiron.  Then on the day of the festival, large rock basins that were usually dry miraculously filled with water.  The water was thought to be a single tear of Yaqub (Jacob) and had marvelous healing properties. As "Meiron water", it was exported to many countries.

A map from Napoleon's invasion of 1799 by Pierre Jacotin  showed the place, named as "Merou".

Meiron suffered relatively minor damage in the Galilee earthquake of 1837. It was reported that during the earthquake the walls of the tombs of Rabbi Eleazer and Rabbi She-Maun were dislodged, but did not collapse. 

A number of European travellers came to Meiron over the course of the 19th century and their observations from the time are documented in travel journals. Edward Robinson, who visited Meiron during his travels in Palestine and Syria in the mid-19th century, describes it as "a very old looking village situated on a ledge of bristling rocks near the foot of the mountain. The ascent is by a very steep and ancient road [...] It is small, and inhabited only by Muhammedans." The tombs of Simeon bar Yochai, his son R. Eleazar, and those of Hillel and Shammai are located by Robinson as lying within a khan-like courtyard underneath low-domed structures that were usually kept closed with the keys held in Safad. Robinson indicates that this place was the focal point of Jewish pilgrimage activities by his time; the synagogue is described as being in ruins.

Laurence Oliphant also visited Meiron sometime in the latter half of the 19th century. His guide there was a Sephardic rabbi who owned the land that made up the Jewish quarter of the village. Oliphant writes that the rabbi had brought 6 Jewish families from Morocco to till the land, and that they and another 12 Muslim families made up the whole of the village's population at the time. Karl Baedeker described it as a small village that appeared quite old with a Muslim population.   In 1881 the PEF's Survey of Western Palestine (SWP) described Meiron as a small village of 50 people, all Muslims, who cultivated olives.

A population list from about 1887 showed  Meiron to have about 175 inhabitants, all Muslim.

British Mandate period

Towards the end of World War I, the ruins of the Meiron synagogue were acquired by the "Fund for the Redemption of Historical Sites" (Qeren le-Geulat Meqomot Histori'im), a Jewish society headed by David Yellin.

In the 1922 census of Palestine conducted by the British Mandate authorities, Mairun had a population of 154; all Muslims.  By 1931,  Meiron consisted of an Arab and Jewish quarter, with the former being the larger one and the latter being built around the tomb of Simeon bar Yochai. That year, there were 158 Arabs and 31 Jews in Meiron; a total of 189 people,  in 47 houses.

In the  1945 statistics, conducted toward the end of the British Mandate in Palestine, depicted an entirely Muslim population of 290 people.  Meiron had a boy's elementary school. Agriculture and livestock was the dominant economic sectors of the village, with grain being the primary crop, followed by fruits. Around 200 dunams of land were planted with olive trees, and there were two presses in the village used to process olives.

1948 War and aftermath
Meiron's villagers were driven out in two waves: one shortly after the capture of Safad by Haganah on 10–11 May 1948, and the other at the end of October 1948, after Meiron itself was occupied.  According to Nafez Nazzal, three Israeli planes bombed Meiron, together with the villages of Tarshiha, Safsaf and Jish during Operation Hiram on October 28, and many villagers were killed. One Israeli account states that there were 80 dead left after the defenders had withdrawn.

State of Israel
The Israeli moshav of Meron, established in 1949, now sits on the lands of the former Palestinian village.

Excavations were carried out in ancient Meiron in 1971–72, 1974–75, and 1977 by Eric M. and Carol L. Meyers.

Jewish pilgrimages to Meiron continue to be held annually on Lag BaOmer, which falls between Passover and Shavuot, at which time hundreds of thousands of Jews gather at the tomb of Simeon bar Yochai to partake in days of festivities, that include the lighting of bonfires at night.

See also
Depopulated Palestinian locations in Israel

References

Bibliography

 

 
 
 

 

 

 (pp. 333 ff, 367, 2nd appendix, p. 134)

External links
Welcome to Mirun, Palestine Remembered
Mirun, Zochrot
Survey of Western Palestine, Map 4: IAA, Wikimedia commons 
Mirun, from the Khalil Sakakini Cultural Center
Mirun, Dr. Khalil Rizk
Miroun photos from Dr. Moslih Kanaaneh 

District of Safad
Arab villages depopulated during the 1948 Arab–Israeli War